

Best-selling singles in France

2 million or more copies

1,200,000 copies to 1,800,000 copies

1,000,000 to 1,190,000 copies

900,000 to 990,000 copies

References

France
French music industry
French music-related lists